Jaedepo District is one of 16 districts located in Sinoe County, Liberia. As of 2008, it had a population of 8,596.

References

 

Districts of Liberia
Sinoe County